Adoxophyes privatana, the appleleaf-curling moth, is a moth of the family Tortricidae. The species was first described by Francis Walker in 1863. It is native to south-east Asia, where it has been recorded from Taiwan, Hong Kong, Hainan in China, Nepal, India, Sri-Lanka, Thailand, Vietnam, western Malaysia, Singapore, Sumatra, Java, Borneo, the Philippines and the Chagos Archipelago. It is an accidental introduction in Great Britain.

Description
The wingspan is 15–19 mm. In China this species has several generations per year.

The larvae feed on various trees, including fruit trees such as mandarin and guava. Recorded food plants include Alternanthera sessilis, Cantharospermum barbatum, Calophyllum inophyllum, Camellia, Carica papaya, Cassia siamea, Citrus, Croton, Derris, Eugenia aquea, Evodia accedens, Desmodium gyroides, Eugenia densiflora, Flacourtia, Glycine max, Jasminum sambac, Lantana, Linum, Mangifera indica, Nephelium lappaceum, Nephelium litchi, Ricinus, Schima noronhae, Sida acuta, Solanum torvum, Theobroma and Vitex negundo. Young larvae spin silk threads and are easily blown by wind to various parts of young leaves and buds. Later, they web several leaves, or leaves and fruit, together to form a nest. The larvae feed on the plant parts enclosed by their nests.

Pupation takes place in the last larval nest or between two leaves, where it spins some defensive silken membranes and a thin cocoon around the body. The pupal stage lasts 4–27 days.

References

External links

Eurasian Tortricidae

Moths described in 1863
Adoxophyes
Moths of Asia